Dylan Riley Williams (born 13 September 2003) is an English footballer who plays as a left-back for  club Chelsea.

Career
Williams made his debut for Derby County in a 2–0 FA Cup loss to Chorley on 9 January 2021. He was one of fourteen players from Derby County's academy to make their debut in the game, after the entirety of Derby's first team squad and coaching team were forced to isolate due to a COVID-19 outbreak. He made his second appearance, appearing alongside members of Derby County's first team, in a 3–3 Carabao Cup draw against Salford City on 10 August 2021.

On 22 January 2022, he signed a professional contract with Chelsea.

Career statistics

References

2003 births
Living people
English footballers
Association football defenders
Derby County F.C. players
Chelsea F.C. players
English Football League players
Sportspeople from Shrewsbury